Ballinacourty, officially Ballynacourty, is a rural area and townland on the southern coast of Ireland near Dungarvan, County Waterford.

Transport
A magnesite factory in the area was served by the last remaining part of the Waterford-Mallow railway line until the late 1980s.

Ballinacourty lighthouse, which stands at the entrance to Dungarvan Harbour, was built in 1858.

Sport
The local Gaelic Athletic Association club is Abbeyside/Ballinacourty GAA. The club plays both hurling and gaelic football and competes in both senior codes in the county.

References

External links
 Railway Line
 Parliamentary debate on closure of Quigley Magnesite plant
 Lighthouse
 Video of Quigley Magnesite plant

Geography of County Waterford